Leaf was a Dutch band from Utrecht. Their first single, Wonderwoman was released in October 2007.

Leaf was founded in 2005 by a group of students from the Rockacademie. The band played acoustic pop songs and had quite a bit of success at the Dutch Popronde 2006. In the spring of 2007 they came out on top in a talent contest held by the Dutch newspaper De Telegraaf. The band members were Annemarie Brohm, Tinus Konijnenburg, Ocker Gevaerts, Joni Scholten and Jeroen Blumers.

The band's independently produced album 'Life's a Beach' was received very well, and was later re-released on 16 November 2007 after securing a record label. One of the most popular singles on the album is Wonderwoman (a.k.a. "Why's my Life so Boring"), which went on to become a top 10 hit in the Dutch Top 40 charts. The song got an additional popularity boost due to it being used in the television show Koefnoen.

The band split up on 12 January 2009 due to creative differences within the group.

Discography

Albums 
 2007: Life's a Beach

Singles

Dutch pop music groups